Robert Nathan Mathis (born February 26, 1981) is an American former professional football player who spent his entire 14-year career as a defensive end and outside linebacker with the Indianapolis Colts of the National Football League (NFL). He played college football at Alabama A&M University and was drafted by the Colts in the fifth round of the 2003 NFL Draft. A five-time Pro Bowler, Mathis won Super Bowl XLI with the Colts in 2006 over the Chicago Bears. He is also the NFL's all-time leader in forced fumbles and strip sacks. The year after retiring, Mathis joined the Colts as an assistant defensive coach.

Early years
Mathis was born in Atlanta, Georgia.  He attended McNair High School in Atlanta. He was classmates with Gucci Mane.

College career
Mathis enrolled in at Alabama A&M University, where he was a four-year starter for the Bulldogs.  He set an NCAA I-AA record with 20 sacks during his senior season and established himself as one of the most dominant defensive players in NCAA I-AA history. In the summer of 2010, Mathis graduated with a degree in exercise science with a minor in physical education, and is a member of the Omega Psi Phi fraternity, Nu Epsilon chapter.

Professional career

Indianapolis Colts

2003–2005
Mathis was selected by the Indianapolis Colts with the 138th selection in the 2003 NFL Draft.

Mathis immediately stepped in during his rookie season as a pass rush specialist, playing in all 16 regular season games and recording 20 tackles, 3.5 sacks and 3 forced fumbles. During his second season, Mathis took another step forward as he increased his numbers to 36 tackles, 10.5 sacks and 6 forced fumbles, despite appearing only as a specialist and starting only 1 game. In Mathis's third season, he set a Colts franchise record with 8 consecutive games with at least 1 sack, and finished the season with 54 tackles, 11.5 sacks and 8 forced fumbles, despite missing three games due to injuries.

2006–2011
Following the 2005 season, Robert Mathis signed a 5-year extension with the Colts worth $30 million, making him one of the highest paid defensive ends in the league at the time. The following season, Mathis started every game for the first time in his career, recording a career-high 65 tackles along with 9.5 sacks and 6 forced fumbles. That year, Mathis helped the Colts go on to beat the Chicago Bears in Super Bowl XLI to become NFL Champions. In 2007, Mathis recorded 32 tackles, 7 sacks and 4 forced fumbles in an injury shortened season.

In 2008, Mathis had his best statistical season to date, posting 48 tackles, 11.5 sacks and 5 forced fumbles. He was also voted to the 2009 Pro Bowl for the AFC behind then-teammate and perennial Pro-Bowler Dwight Freeney.

In November 2009, Mathis won his first career AFC Defensive Player of the Month award, and finished the season with 37 tackles, 9.5 sacks, and 5 forced fumbles. He would win his second such award for his defensive performance in September 2010, and would finish 2010 with 60 tackles, 11 sacks, and 1 forced fumble.

Mathis recorded 9.5 sacks during the 2011 regular season, along with 43 tackles and 3 forced fumbles. It was the seventh season in his 9-year NFL career that he had at least 9.5 sacks. On January 2, 2012 Mathis was added to the AFC Pro Bowl Roster to replace Patriots DE Andre Carter. On January 23, 2012 Mathis decided not to play in Pro Bowl. Mathis recorded 33 tackles, 8 sacks, and 1 forced fumble in 12 games during the 2012 season.

2012–2016
On March 5, 2012, Mathis signed a one-year tender worth $10.6 million. He then signed a four-year $36 million contract on the same day. Mathis began playing strong-side outside linebacker under new Colts head coach Chuck Pagano during the 2012 season. He recorded his first interception against Detroit Lions quarterback Matthew Stafford in a 35-33 win during week 13.

In week 5 of the 2013 season against the Seattle Seahawks, Mathis recorded the 100th sack of his career. He became the 30th player in league history to accomplish the feat. He was named the AFC Defensive Player of the Month for October, the third time he has won the award.

On November 24, 2013 during a game against the Cardinals, Mathis recorded his 40th career strip sack, breaking the previous record held by Jason Taylor.

In a Week 15 matchup with the Houston Texans on December 15, 2013, Mathis sacked quarterback Case Keenum giving him the Colts' single-season record of 16.5 sacks and the franchise record of 108.0 career sacks, breaking marks previously held by Dwight Freeney, his former teammate. It was also his 42nd strip sack of his career, adding to his NFL record of career sack forced fumbles.

Mathis would lead the NFL in sacks with 19.5, a half sack more than Robert Quinn of the St. Louis Rams. He was awarded the inaugural Deacon Jones award for leading the NFL in sacks, and also won his second AFC Defensive Player of the Month award of the 2013 season for his performance in December. He finished second in the Defensive Player of the Year voting behind Luke Kuechly of the Carolina Panthers.

On May 16, 2014, it was announced that Mathis would serve a 4-game suspension for violating the leagues' drug policy. Mathis issued a statement later that day claiming that his violation of the league's performance-enhancing drug policy was due to taking unapproved fertility drugs to conceive a child.

On September 8, 2014, it was reported that Mathis had torn his Achilles tendon while working out on his own, sidelining him for the season. The Colts signed Mathis to a one-year extension on September 30, 2014.

During the 2015 season, Mathis won the AFC Defensive Player of the Week award for Week 16 after totalling two sacks against the Dolphins, including one to end the game. Coincidentally, former teammate Dwight Freeney won the award for the NFC for the same week.

On December 30, 2016, Mathis announced that he would retire following the Colts Week 17 game against the Jacksonville Jaguars. In the game Mathis recorded three tackles and a strip sack, which was the 123rd sack of his career. He passed former teammate Dwight Freeney (122.5) for 17th most sacks in NFL history, and extended his own record for most career strip sacks (47). For his efforts in the game, he was named the AFC Defensive Player of the Week.

NFL career statistics

Regular season

Postseason

Personal life
Mathis appeared as himself in the episode "Fluoride" of the comedy television series Parks and Recreation, alongside teammates Andrew Luck, Reggie Wayne, Adam Vinatieri, Anthony Castonzo, and Colts owner Jim Irsay.

In 2017, Mathis joined the Colts coaching staff as a Pass Rush Consultant.

References

External links

 Indianapolis Colts bio

1981 births
Living people
Players of American football from Atlanta
African-American players of American football
American football defensive ends
American football linebackers
Alabama A&M Bulldogs football players
Indianapolis Colts players
American Conference Pro Bowl players
Unconferenced Pro Bowl players
21st-century African-American sportspeople
20th-century African-American people
100 Sacks Club
Ed Block Courage Award recipients